Caroline Rask (born 25 May 1994) is a Danish football midfielder who currently plays for PSV in the Netherlands. She has previously played for Fortuna Hjørring, and A.C. Milan and has also played for the Danish women's national team. Rask joined Fortuna Hjørring in 2011 and made her senior international debut as a substitute for Pernille Harder in Denmark's 2-2 tie with Portugal during the 2015 Algarve Cup – during which she also scored her first international goal.

Honours

Club
Fortuna Hjørring
Champion
 Elitedivisionen: 2013–14, 2015–16, 2017-18, 2019-20
 Danish Women's Cup: 2016, 2019

References

External links
 Danish Football Union (DBU) statistics
 Fortuna player profile
 
 

1994 births
Living people
Danish women's footballers
Denmark women's international footballers
Fortuna Hjørring players
Women's association football midfielders
People from Vesthimmerland Municipality
Sportspeople from the North Jutland Region
PSV (women) players